Charles Albert "Bert" Weeden (December 21, 1882 – January 7, 1939) was a Major League Baseball player who played in  with the Boston Rustlers as a pinch hitter. He was a catcher during his long minor league career that lasted from 1905 to 1923 and included several jobs as player/manager in the minors.

He was born and died in Northwood, New Hampshire.

External links

Boston Rustlers players
Minor league baseball managers
New Haven Blues players
Holyoke Paperweights players
Troy Trojans (minor league) players
New Bedford Whalers (baseball) players
Gloversville-Johnstown Jags players
Elmira Colonels players
Lynn Shoemakers players
Youngstown Steelmen players
Haverhill Hustlers players
Brockton Shoemakers players
Lynn Leonardites players
Fall River Adopted Sons players
Brockton Pilgrims players
Hagerstown Terriers players
Providence Grays (minor league) players
Hanover Raiders players
Waterloo Hawks (baseball) players
Baseball players from New Hampshire
1882 births
1939 deaths